Funding is the act of providing resources to finance a need, program, or project. While this is usually in the form of money, it can also take the form of effort or time from an organization or company. Generally, this word is used when a firm uses its internal reserves to satisfy its necessity for cash, while the term financing is used when the firm acquires capital from external sources.

Sources of funding include credit, venture capital, donations, grants, savings, subsidies, and taxes. Fundings such as donations, subsidies, and grants that have no direct requirement for return of investment are described as "soft funding" or "crowdfunding". Funding that facilitates the exchange of equity ownership in a company for capital investment via an online funding portal per the Jumpstart Our Business Startups Act (alternately, the "JOBS Act of 2012") (U.S.) is known as equity crowdfunding.

Funds can be allocated for either short-term or long-term purposes.

Economics

In economics funds are injected into the market as capital by lenders and taken as loans by borrowers. There are two ways in which the capital can end up at the borrower. The lender can lend the capital to a financial intermediary against interest. These financial intermediaries then reinvest the money against a higher rate. The use of financial intermediaries to finance operations is called indirect finance. A lender can also go to the financial markets to directly lend to a borrower. This method is called direct finance.

Purpose of Funding

Research funding
Research funding is funding used for research-related purposes. It is most often used to describe funding in the fields of technology or social science. The allocation of funds are usually granted based on a per project, department, or institute basis stemming from scope of the research or project. Research funding can be split into commercial and non-commercial allocations. Research and development departments of a corporation normally provide commercial research funding.  Whereas, non-commercial research funding is obtained from charities, research councils, or government agencies. Organizations that require such funding normally have to go through competitive selections. Only those that have the most potential would be chosen. Funding is vital in ensuring the sustainability of certain projects.

Launch a business
Entrepreneurs with a business concept would want to accumulate all the necessary resources including capital to venture into a market. Funding is part of the process, as some businesses would require large start-up sums that individuals would not have. These start-up funds are essential to kick-start a business idea, without it, entrepreneurs would not have the ability to carry out their concepts in the business world.

Uses on investment
Fund management companies gather pools of money from many investors and use them to purchase securities. These funds are managed by professional investment managers, which may generate higher returns with reduced risks by asset diversification. The size of these funds could be as little as a few millions or as much as multi billions. The purpose of these funding activities is mainly aiming to pursue individual or organization profits.

Methods of Funding

Government Grants

Government could allocate funds itself or through government agencies to projects that benefit the public through a selection process to students or researchers and even organizations.  At least two external peer-reviewers and an internal research award committee review each application. The research awards committee would meet some time to discuss shortlisted applications. A further shortlist and ranking is made. Projects are funded and applicants are informed. Econometric evidence shows public grants for firms can create additionality in jobs, sales, value added, innovation and capital. For example, this was shown to be the case for large R&D grants, as well as smaller public grants for the tourism firms or small and medium sized firms in general.

Crowdfunding

Crowdfunding exists in mainly two types, reward-based crowdfunding and equity-based crowdfunding. In the former, small firms could pre-sell a product or service to start a business whereas in the latter, backers buy a certain amount of shares of a firm in exchange of money. As for reward-based crowdfunding, project creators would set a funding target and deadline.  Anyone who is interested can pledge on the projects. Projects must reach its targeted amount in order for it to be carried out. Once the projects ended with enough funds, projects creators would have to make sure that they fulfill their promises by the intended timeline and delivery their products or services.

Raise from investors
To raise capital, you require funds from investors who are interested in the investments. You have to present those investors with high-return projects. By displaying high-level potentials of the projects, investors would be more attracted to put their money into those projects. After a certain amount of time, usually in a year’s time, rewards of the investment will be shared with investors. This makes investors happy and they may continue to invest further. If returns do not meet the intended level, this could reduce the willingness of investors to invest their money into the funds. Hence, the amounts of financial incentives are highly weighted determinants to ensure the funding remains at a desirable level.

Self-Organized Funding Allocation

Self-organized funding allocation (SOFA) is a method of distributing funding for scientific research. In this system, each researcher is allocated an equal amount of funding, and is required to anonymously allocate a fraction of their funds to the research of others. Proponents of SOFA argue that it would result in similar distribution of funding as the present grant system, but with less overhead. In 2016, a test pilot of SOFA began in the Netherlands.

Securing loans 
A company or an individual may secure a loan to get access to capital. Often borrowers must use a secured loan where assets are pledged as collateral. If the borrower defaults, ownership of the collateral reverts to the lender. Both tangible and intangible assets can be used to secure loans.  The use of IP as collateral in IP-backed finance transactions is the subject of a report series at the World Intellectual Property Organization.

Withdrawal of funding 

Withdrawal of funding, or defunding, occurs when funding previously given to an organisation ceases, especially in relation to Governmental funding.
Defunding could be as a result of a disagreement or failure to meet set objectives. An example that explains the withdrawal of funding in this case is that of President Trump's decision to stop funding the World Health Organization (WHO) over alleged Coronavirus mismanagement.

See also

 Foundation (non-profit)
 Investment
 Investment fund
 Crowdfunding
 Peer-to-peer lending
 Research funding
 Seed money
 Micro finance
 Mutual fund
 Trust Fund
 Equity fund
Intangible asset finance

References

Business terms
Fundraising